The index of physics articles is split into multiple pages due to its size.

To navigate by individual letter use the table of contents below.

L

L. Gary Leal
L. M. Milne-Thomson
L3 (CERN)
LAGEOS
LAMMPS
LARES (satellite)
LCGT
Left-handed material
LEPS
LEPS2
LHC@home
LHCb
LHCf
LHS 3508
LIDAR
LIESST
LIGO
LOCC
LOPES (telescope)
LRAD Corporation
LSZ reduction formula
LUCID
LULI2000
L band
Laboratori Nazionali del Gran Sasso
Laboratory for Laser Energetics
Laboratory frame of reference
Laboratory oven
Laboratory techniques
Laboratório Nacional de Luz Síncrotron
Ladder operator
Ladder paradox
Ladislas Goldstein
Lagrangian mechanics
Lagrangian analysis
Lagrangian and Eulerian specification of the flow field
Lagrangian coherent structures
Lagrangian mechanics
Lagrangian (field theory)
Lagrangian particle tracking
Lagrangian point
Lamb shift
Lamb waves
Lambda-CDM model
Lambda baryon
Lambda point
Lambda point refrigerator
Lambda transition
Lambdavacuum solution
Lambert's cosine law
Lambert's problem
Lambert (unit)
Lambert radiator
Lambertian reflectance
Lamb–Mössbauer factor
Lamb–Oseen vortex
Lamellar vector field
Laminar–turbulent transition
Laminar flow
Laminar sublayer
Lamm equation
Lamé parameters
Lancelot Law Whyte
Lanczos tensor
Land speed
Landau Institute for Theoretical Physics
Landau damping
Landau pole
Landau quantization
Landau theory
Landauer's principle
Landauer formula
Landau–Hopf theory of turbulence
Landau–Lifshitz–Gilbert equation
Landau–Zener formula
Landolt–Börnstein
Landspout
Landé g-factor
Landé interval rule
Lane–Emden equation
Langevin dynamics
Langevin equation
Langevin function
Langmuir circulation
Langmuir probe
Langmuir waves
Langmuir–Blodgett film
Langworthy Professor
Laplace formula
Laplace number
Laplace pressure
Laplace series
Laplace–Runge–Lenz vector
Lapse rate
Large Apparatus studying Grand Unification and Neutrino Astrophysics
Large Area Neutron Detector
Large Electron–Positron Collider
Large Hadron Collider
Large Helical Device
Large Plasma Device
Large Underground Xenon experiment
Large Volume Detector
Large diffeomorphism
Large eddy simulation
Large electrostatic generator (Teylers)
Large extra dimension
Large gauge transformation
Larkin Kerwin
Larmor formula
Larmor precession
Larry Smarr
Lars Onsager
Lars Onsager Prize
Larson–Miller relation
Laser
Laser-heated pedestal growth
Laser-induced fluorescence
Laser-induced incandescence
LaserMotive
Laser Accelerometer
Laser Doppler velocimetry
Laser Interferometer Space Antenna
Laser Interferometry Space Antenna
Laser Mégajoule
Laser Physics (journal)
Laser Physics Letters
Laser ablation
Laser ablation synthesis in solution
Laser accelerometer
Laser acronyms
Laser construction
Laser cooling
Laser diode
Laser diode rate equations
Laser engraving
Laser integration line
Laser propulsion
Laser protection eyewear
Laser pumping
Laser rangefinder
Laser safety
Laser science
Laser snow
Laser ultrasonics
Laser voltage prober
Lasing threshold
Laszlo B. Kish
Latent heat
Latent heat flux
Latent internal energy
Lateral flow test
Lateral force variation
Lattice Boltzmann methods
Lattice QCD
Lattice constant
Lattice density functional theory
Lattice diffusion coefficient
Lattice field theory
Lattice gas automaton
Lattice gauge theory
Lattice model (physics)
Laughlin wavefunction
Laura Bassi
Laurence E. Peterson
Laurent Freidel
Lauro Moscardini
Lavo Čermelj
Law of conservation of matter
Law of the wall
Lawrence M. Krauss
Lawrence Paul Horwitz
Laws of science
Laws of thermodynamics
Lawson criterion
Lax pair
Lax–Friedrichs method
Lax–Wendroff method
Lazare Carnot
Lazarus effect
LeConte Hall
LeRoy Apker
LeRoy Apker Award (APS)
LeRoy radius
Le Sage's theory of gravitation
Lead shielding
Leader (spark)
Leading-edge extension
Leading edge
Leading edge cuff
Leading-edge slat
Leading edge slot
Leakage (electronics)
Leakage (semiconductors)
Leaky mode
Leapfrog integration
Least count
Least distance of distinct vision
Lebedev Physical Institute
Lebesgue spine
Lecture Notes in Physics
Ledinegg instability
Lee Alvin DuBridge
Lee C. Teng
Lee Davenport
Lee Segel
Lee Smolin
Lee wave
Left-handed material
Left–right symmetry
Leidenfrost effect
Leigh Canham
Leigh Page
Leland I. Anderson
Leland John Haworth
Lemaître coordinates
Lemaître–Tolman metric
Lene Hau
Length contraction
Length scale
Lennard-Jones potential
Lenoir cycle
Lens (optics)
Lens sag
Lenticular lens
Lenz's law
Leo Brewer
Leo Esaki
Leo Graetz
Leo Kadanoff
Leo Palatnik
Leon Cooper
Leon Knopoff
Leon M. Lederman
Leon Mestel
Leona Woods
Leonard Huxley (physicist)
Leonard M. Rieser
Leonard Mandel
Leonard Mlodinow
Leonard Ornstein
Leonard Parker
Leonard Reiffel
Leonard Susskind
Leonard T. Troland
Leonardo Chiariglione
Leonhard Euler
Leonid Brekhovskikh
Leonid I. Sedov
Leonid Mandelstam
Leonid Mikhailovich Shkadov
Leonid Yatsenko
Leonidas Resvanis
Leopold B. Felsen
Leopold Biwald
Leopold Infeld
Leopoldo Máximo Falicov
Leopoldo Nobili
Leptogenesis (physics)
Lepton
Lepton epoch
Lepton mixing matrix
Lepton number
Leptoquark
Leroy Dubeck
Les Houches Accords
Leslie H. Martin
Leslie Martin (disambiguation)
Leslie cube
Leste
Lester Germer
Lester Hogan
Let There Be Light (Howard Smith book)
Letter to the Grand Duchess Christina
Lettere al Nuovo Cimento
Leucippus
Lev Artsimovich
Lev Gor'kov
Lev Landau
Lev Lipatov
Lev Okun
Lev Pavlovich Rapoport
Lev Shubnikov
Lev Vaidman
Level-spacing distribution
Level of free convection
Level-set method
Lever
Leverett J-function
Levi-Civita symbol
Levitated dipole
Levitation
Lew Kowarski
Lewi Tonks
Lewis Fry Richardson
Lewis M. Branscomb
Lewis Salter
Lewis number
Lewis pair
Leyden jar
Leó Szilárd
Li Aizhen
Lianxing Wen
Lichtenberg figure
Lie superalgebra
Lieb–Liniger model
Liesegang rings
Lift-induced drag
Lift-to-drag ratio
Lift (force)
Lift coefficient
Lifted condensation level
Lifting-line theory
Ligand K-edge
Light
Light-dragging effects
Light-induced voltage alteration
Light-year
Light dark matter
Light air
Light beam
Light cone
Light-cone coordinates
Light cone gauge
Light dark matter
Light field
Light front holography
Light front quantization
Light pillar
Light scattering
Light scattering by particles
Light-water reactor
Lightcraft
Lighter than air
Lightest Supersymmetric Particle
Lighthill mechanism
Lightning
Liljequist parhelion
Limit loads
Limiting magnitude
Lincoln Wolfenstein
Lindblad equation
Lindblad superoperator
Line element
Line of action
Line of force
Line source
Linear-rotational analogs
Linear acetylenic carbon
Linear canonical transformation
Linear combination of atomic orbitals
Linear compressor
Linear density
Linear dynamical system
Linear elasticity
Linear energy transfer
Linear entropy
Linear flow on the torus
Linear motion
Linear particle accelerator
Linear phase
Linear polarization
Linear response function
Linearised Einstein field equations
Linearization
Linearized gravity
Linus Pauling
Lionel G. Harrison
Lionel Robert Wilberforce
Liouville's theorem (Hamiltonian)
Liouville dynamical system
Liouville field theory
Lippmann electrometer
Lippmann–Schwinger equation
Liquefaction
Liquefaction of gases
Liquid
Liquid Scintillator Neutrino Detector
Liquid bubble
Liquid crystal
Liquid-crystal laser
Liquid-crystal polymer
Liquid drop model
Liquid fluoride thorium reactor
Liquid helium
Liquid hydrogen
Liquid oxygen
Liquid water path
Liquidus
Lisa Randall
Lise Meitner
Lissajous orbit
List of Cornell Manhattan Project people
List of Directors General of CERN
List of Feynman diagrams
List of IEEE awards
List of IEEE societies
List of Large Hadron Collider experiments
List of National Inventors Hall of Fame inductees
List of Nikola Tesla patents
List of Nobel laureates in Physics
List of OSA awards
List of Super Proton Synchrotron experiments
List of accelerator mass spectrometry facilities
List of accelerators in particle physics
List of alpha emitting materials
List of area moments of inertia
List of atmospheric radiative transfer codes
List of baryons
List of black holes
List of centroids
List of common physics notations
List of cosmic microwave background experiments
List of cosmologists
List of dynamical systems and differential equations topics
List of electromagnetism equations
List of elementary physics formulae
List of equations in classical mechanics
List of equations in fluid mechanics
List of equations in gravitation
List of equations in nuclear and particle physics
List of equations in quantum mechanics
List of equations in wave theory
List of experimental errors and frauds in physics
List of fluid flows named after people
List of fluid mechanics journals
List of fusion experiments
List of fusion power technologies
List of geophysicists
List of historic tsunamis
List of hydrodynamic instabilities named after people
List of important publications in geology
List of important publications in physics
List of interstellar and circumstellar molecules
List of laser applications
List of laser articles
List of laser types
List of lens designs
List of letters used in mathematics and science
List of light sources
List of loop quantum gravity researchers
List of materials properties
List of mathematical topics in quantum theory
List of mathematical topics in relativity
List of mesons
List of moments of inertia
List of neutrino experiments
List of noise topics
List of nonlinear partial differential equations
List of ocean circulation models
List of orbits
List of particles
List of photonics equations
List of physical quantities
List of physicists
List of physics concepts in primary and secondary education curricula
List of physics journals
List of plasma (physics) articles
List of plasma physicists
List of quantum field theories
List of quantum gravity researchers
List of quasiparticles
List of refractive indices
List of relativistic equations
List of rogue waves
List of scientific constants named after people
List of scientific publications by Albert Einstein
List of scientists whose names are used as SI units
List of scientists whose names are used as non SI units
List of scientists whose names are used in physical constants
List of semiconductor materials
List of standard Gibbs free energies of formation
List of states of matter
List of string theory topics
List of synchrotron radiation facilities
List of telescope types
List of textbooks in statistical mechanics
List of theoretical physicists
List of thermal conductivities
List of thermodynamic properties
List of things named after Albert Einstein
List of topics characterized as pseudoscience
List of types of interferometers
List of unsolved problems in physics
List of unusual units of measurement
List of waves named after people
List of works by Nikolay Bogolyubov
Listing's law
Lithium-ion capacitor
Lithium Tokamak Experiment
Lithium burning
Lithium iron phosphate battery
Lithium triborate
Little Higgs
Little hierarchy problem
Little string theory
Little–Parks effect
Liu Chen (physicist)
Live MOS
Living Reviews in Relativity
Living Reviews in Solar Physics
Liviu Constantinescu
Liénard equation
Liénard–Wiechert potential
Llevantades
Lloyd's mirror
Lloyd Berkner
Lloyd Cross
Load factor (aeronautics)
Local-density approximation
Local Lorentz covariance
Local density of states
Local hidden-variable theory
Local oxidation nanolithography
Local quantum field theory
Local reference frame
Local spacetime structure
Local symmetry
Lochlainn O'Raifeartaigh
Lock-in amplifier
Lockin effect
Logarithmic Schrödinger equation
Logarithmic conformal field theory
Loker Hydrocarbon Research Institute
London equations
London field
London moment
London penetration depth
Long-lived fission product
Long-period fiber grating
Long-range order
Long Baseline Neutrino Experiment
Long Josephson junction
Long baseline acoustic positioning system
Long delayed echo
Long path laser
Long wavelength limit
Longitudinal static stability
Look-elsewhere effect
Looming and similar refraction phenomena
Loop braid group
Loop entropy
Loop integral
Loop quantum cosmology
Loop quantum gravity
Loren Acton
Lorentz-violating neutrino oscillations
Lorentz Medal
Lorentz covariance
Lorentz ether theory
Lorentz factor
Lorentz force
Lorentz force velocimetry
Lorentz group
Lorentz interval
Lorentz invariance in loop quantum gravity
Lorentz scalar
Lorentz transformation
Lorentz–Heaviside units
Lorenz Hengler
Lorenz S. Cederbaum
Lorenz gauge condition
Lorenzo A. Richards
Lorin Blodget
Loránd Eötvös
Los Alamos National Laboratory
Los Alamos Neutron Science Center
Los Alamos Primer
Loschmidt's paradox
Loschmidt constant
Lossy medium
Loss–DiVincenzo quantum computer
Lothar Wolfgang Nordheim
Lotus effect
Loudness
Loudspeaker acoustics
Louis-Sébastien Lenormand
Louis Alan Hazeltine
Louis Alfred Becquerel
Louis B. Slichter
Louis Essen
Louis Georges Gouy
Louis Harold Gray
Louis Michel (physicist)
Louis Moresi
Louis Néel
Louis Paul Cailletet
Louis Plack Hammett
Louis Rendu
Louis Ridenour
Louis Rosen
Louis Slotin
Louis Winslow Austin
Louis Witten
Louis de Broglie
Louise Dolan
Loup Verlet
Love wave
Low-dimensional chaos in stellar pulsations
Low-energy electron diffraction
Low-g condition
Low-ionization nuclear emission-line region
Low-κ dielectric
Low Earth orbit
Low Energy Antiproton Ring
Low Energy Ion Ring
Low field NMR
Low frequency
Lower critical solution temperature
Lower tangent arc
Loyd A. Jones
Lubberts effect
Luboš Motl
Lubrication
Lubrication theory
Lubricity
Luca Gammaitoni
Luca Turin
Lucas cell
Luciano Maiani
Luciano Pietronero
Lucien Hardy
Lucien LaCoste
Lucio Russo
Lucy Jones
Ludvig Faddeev
Ludvig Lorenz
Ludwieg tube
Ludwig A. Colding
Ludwig Boltzmann
Ludwig Hopf
Ludwig Lange (physicist)
Ludwig Prandtl
Ludwig Schupmann
Ludwig Waldmann
Ludwig Wilhelm Gilbert
Ludwig Zehnder
Ludwik Leibler
Ludwik Silberstein
Luigi Galvani
Luigi Puccianti
Luis Walter Alvarez
Luisa Ottolini
Luise Meyer-Schützmeister
Luiz Pinguelli Rosa
Luke's variational principle
Luke Chia-Liu Yuan
Lumen (unit)
Luminance
Luminescence
Luminiferous aether
Luminophore
Luminosity
Luminosity distance
Luminosity function
Luminous efficacy
Luminous energy
Luminous flux
Luminous intensity
Lumped component
Lumped element model
Lumped parameters
Lunar Laser Ranging experiment
Lunar eclipse
Lunar theory
Lund string model
Lundquist number
Luneburg lens
Lunitidal interval
Luttinger's theorem
Luttinger liquid
Luttinger parameter
Luttinger–Kohn model
Lux
Lyapunov exponent
Lyapunov time
Lyapunov vector
Lyc photon
Lyman-alpha forest
Lyman-alpha line
Lyman limit
Lyman series
Lyman–Werner photons
Lyn Evans
Lyoluminescence
Lyot filter
Lyot stop
László Tisza
Léon Brillouin
Léon Foucault
Léon Rosenfeld
Léon Van Hove
LC circuit
L–C loaded

Indexes of physics articles